Pollenia bartaki is a species of cluster fly in the family Polleniidae.

Distribution
Jordan.

References

Polleniidae
Insects described in 2016
Diptera of Asia